Traver is a census-designated place (CDP) in Tulare County, California, United States. The population was 713 at the 2010 census, down from 732 at the 2000 census.

Geography
Traver is located at  (36.454300, -119.484182).

Demographics

2010
The 2010 United States Census reported that Traver had a population of 713. The racial makeup of Traver was 302 (42.4%) White, 1 (0.1%) African American, 22 (3.1%) Native American, 6 (0.8%) Asian, 2 (0.3%) Pacific Islander, 357 (50.1%) from other races, and 23 (3.2%) from two or more races. Hispanic or Latino of any race were 551 persons (77.3%).

The Census reported that 713 people (100% of the population) lived in households, 0 (0%) lived in non-institutionalized group quarters, and 0 (0%) were institutionalized.

There were 164 households, out of which 89 (54.3%) had children under the age of 18 living in them, 96 (58.5%) were opposite-sex married couples living together, 32 (19.5%) had a female householder with no husband present, 11 (6.7%) had a male householder with no wife present.  There were 5 (3.0%) unmarried opposite-sex partnerships, and 0 (0%) same-sex married couples or partnerships. 19 households (11.6%) were made up of individuals, and 8 (4.9%) had someone living alone who was 65 years of age or older. The average household size was 4.35.  There were 139 families (84.8% of all households); the average family size was 4.50.

The population was spread out, with 222 people (31.1%) under the age of 18, 89 people (12.5%) aged 18 to 24, 187 people (26.2%) aged 25 to 44, 138 people (19.4%) aged 45 to 64, and 77 people (10.8%) who were 65 years of age or older.  The median age was 29.7 years. For every 100 females, there were 106.7 males.  For every 100 females age 18 and over, there were 127.3 males.

The homeowner vacancy rate was 4.0%; the rental vacancy rate was 2.8%.  382 people (53.6% of the population) lived in owner-occupied housing units and 331 people (46.4%) lived in rental housing units.

2000
As of the census of 2000, there were 732 people, 173 households, and 155 families residing in the CDP. The racial makeup of the CDP was 53.28% White, 2.32% Native American, 0.14% Asian, 41.94% from other races, and 2.32% from two or more races. Hispanic or Latino of any race were 75.41% of the population.

There were 173 households, out of which 53.2% had children under the age of 18 living with them, 63.6% were married couples living together, 20.2% had a female householder with no husband present, and 10.4% were non-families. 5.2% of all households were made up of individuals, and 3.5% had someone living alone who was 65 years of age or older.  The average household size was 4.23 and the average family size was 4.12.

In the CDP, the population was spread out, with 37.4% under the age of 18, 12.2% from 18 to 24, 28.0% from 25 to 44, 14.3% from 45 to 64, and 8.1% who were 65 years of age or older.  The median age was 25 years. For every 100 females, there were 105.0 males.  For every 100 females age 18 and over, there were 115.0 males.

The median income for a household in the CDP was $24,500, and the median income for a family was $22,750. Males had a median income of $17,188 versus $20,000 for females. The per capita income for the CDP was $7,642.  About 23.5% of families and 33.2% of the population were below the poverty line, including 50.2% of those under age 18 and 7.4% of those age 65 or over.

Politics
In the state legislature Traver is located in the 16th Senate District, represented by Democrat Dean Florez, and in the 30th Assembly District, represented by Republican Danny Gilmore.

In the United States House of Representatives, Traver is in

Born in Traver 
 Paul Hurst (1888-1953), American film actor

See also

References

External links

Census-designated places in Tulare County, California
Census-designated places in California